Papora may refer to:
Papora (language education company)
Papora people
Papora language